Kevin Richardson may refer to:

 Kevin Richardson (American football) (born 1986), American football player
 Kevin Richardson (baseball) (born 1980), American baseball player
 Kevin Richardson (footballer) (born 1962), English footballer
 Kevin Michael Richardson (born 1964), American film, television and voice actor
 Kevin Richardson (musician) (born 1971), American musician and member of the Backstreet Boys
 Kevin Richardson (zookeeper) (born 1974), South African lion keeper 
 Mo Heart, real name Kevin Richardson (born 1986), American drag queen